Adam Gordon may refer to:

Adam Gordon of Auchindoun (1545–1580), Scottish soldier
Lord Adam Gordon (British Army officer) (1726–1801), Scottish soldier and politician
Adam Gordon (Canadian politician) (1831–1876), Canadian politician
Lord Adam Gordon (1909–1984), British royal courtier
Adam Lindsay Gordon, Australian poet, jockey and politician

See also
Adam de Gordon (disambiguation)
Gordon Adam, engineer
Gordon Adam (rower)